The Port of San Jose, Occidental Mindoro also known as the Caminawit Port is a seaport in San Jose, Occidental Mindoro in the Philippines. It was the main seaport of Occidental Mindoro. Both in shipping cargo and ferrying passengers has been suspended by the port authority due to heavy siltation.

The concrete pier is connected to  concrete ramp.

References

San Jose, Occidental Mindoro Port
Buildings and structures in Occidental Mindoro
Transportation in Luzon